The Ilchamus (sometimes spelled Iltiamus, also known as Njemps), are a Maa-speaking people living south and southeast of Lake Baringo, Kenya. They numbered approximately 32,949 people in 2019 and are closely related to the Samburu living more to the north-east in the Rift Valley Province. They are one of the smallest ethnic groups in Kenya.

In their oral traditions, the Ilchamus economy underwent a succession of elaborations: from foraging and fishing to a sophisticated system of irrigation, and then this was mixed with pastoralism under the influence of Samburu immigrants and neighbouring Maasai. These changes involved a series of embellishments in their culture and social organization. However, this evolving system did not survive the challenges of the capitalist economy in post-colonial Kenya, leading to a more polarized society with diminishing prospects for the majority of Ilchamus.

Language

Camus or Chamus (autonym: il-Chamus) is classified under the Maa languages in the Eastern Nilotic language branch. It is closely related to the Samburu language (between 89% and 94% lexical similarity), to the point of being considered a Samburu dialect by some. Together, Samburu and il-Chamus form the northern division of the Maa languages.

See also
 Kamba
 Meru

References

External links
 Ethnologue report on Camus (as a Samburu dialect).
 Samburu and Camus on The Rosetta Project

Languages of Kenya
Maa languages
Ethnic groups in Kenya